Prodoxus sordidus is a moth of the family Prodoxidae. It is found in the United States in the Mojave Desert in south-eastern California, north-western Arizona and southern Nevada.

The wingspan is 8-9.8 mm for males and 9.4-12.3 for females. The forewings are uniform light or occasionally medium tan. The hindwings are light gray along the front edge, gradually fading to light grayish white on the rest of the wing. Adults are on wing from March to mid-May.

The larvae feed on Yucca brevifolia. They feed superficially inside the stalk and can diapause for at least six years before pupation and emergence.

References

Moths described in 1892
Prodoxidae